The men's K-4 1000 metres event was a fours kayaking event conducted as part of the Canoeing at the 1988 Summer Olympics program.

Medalists

Results

Heats
18 crews entered in three heats on September 27. The top three finishers from each of the heats advanced directly to the semifinals while the remaining nine teams were relegated to the repechages.

Repechages
Nine teams competed in two repechages on September 27. The top three finishers from each of the repechages advanced directly to the semifinals.

Semifinals
The top three finishers in each of the semifinals (raced on September 29) advanced to the final.

Norway's reason for not finishing was not disclosed in the official report.

Final
The final was held on October 1.

Hungary was seventh at the 500 meter mark before coming back to lead in the third 250-meter part of the race.

References
1988 Summer Olympics official report Volume 2, Part 2. pp. 341–3. 
Sports-reference.com 1988 K-4 1000 m results.
Wallechinsky, David and Jaime Loucky (2008). "Canoeing: Men's Kayak Fours 1000 Meters". In The Complete Book of the Olympics: 2008 Edition. London: Aurum Press Limited. p. 477.

Men's K-4 1000
Men's events at the 1988 Summer Olympics